Up Here in the Clouds is a 2010 album from Cindytalk released by Editions Mego, catalogue number eMEGO 106.

Background
Up Here in the Clouds is the second album from Cindytalk released by Editions Mego. All tracks were written and recorded by Gordon Sharp, 2003–10.

Reviews of the album include Dusted Magazine and Wire Magazine.

Track listing
 The Eighth Sea (7:49)
 We Are Without Words (6:41)
 I Walk Until I Fall (3:18)
 Guts of London (6:01)
 Switched to Lunar (3:17)
 Hollow Stare (6:25)
 The Anarchist Window (4:47)
 Multiple Landings (8:28)
 Up Here in the Clouds (2:16)

Versions
 CD 2010 Editions Mego
 A vinyl double album The Poetry of Decay collects two Cindytalk albums: The Crackle of My Soul and Up Here in the Clouds.

References

2010 albums
Cindytalk albums
Mego (label) albums